Bhekithemba Maxwell Lubisi (born 1986/1987) is a South African politician who has represented the African National Congress (ANC) in the Mpumalanga Provincial Legislature since 2019. He was elected to his seat in the 2019 general election, ranked 20th on the ANC's party list.

He is from Driekoppies in present-day Mpumalanga and was born in 1986 or 1987. At the time of his election to the legislature, he chaired the ANC Youth League's large regional branch in Ehlanzeni, having been elected to a third term in the position at a chaotic league elective conference in June 2018. Earlier in his tenure, in July 2015, he appeared in the Boschfontein Periodical Court on a murder charge, accused with two others of having fatally assaulted a suspected robber.

References

External links 
 

Living people
Members of the Mpumalanga Provincial Legislature
African National Congress politicians
21st-century South African politicians
Year of birth missing (living people)